The Organic Farming Digest (1946–1954) was the first organic farming magazine to be published by an agricultural association. The magazine was based in Sydney. It was published quarterly. About half of the articles published were by Australian authors, the authors by authors from the rest of the world.

The Organic Farming Digest was published by the Australian Organic Farming and Gardening Society. It was also adopted and distributed as the official publication of the Living Soil Association of Tasmania. The final issue of the Digest was Volume 3, Number 5 dated December 1954. The society was wound up on 19 January 1955 and the reason given was lack of funds.

See also 
 Agriculture
 Organic food

References

1946 establishments in Australia
1954 disestablishments in Australia
Agricultural magazines
Quarterly magazines published in Australia
Defunct magazines published in Australia
English-language magazines
Magazines established in 1946
Magazines disestablished in 1954
Magazines published in Sydney
Organic farming in Australia